The 1998 Oregon gubernatorial election took place on November 3, 1998. Democratic nominee John Kitzhaber easily defeated Republican Bill Sizemore to win a second term. Kitzhaber won 35 out of 36 counties, the only county won by Sizemore was Malheur County. This is the only gubernatorial election since 1982 in Oregon in which the margin of victory was in double digits. It is also the most recent election in which any county in Eastern Oregon or Southern Oregon voted for the Democratic nominee, and the most recent gubernatorial election in which a candidate would win while carrying the majority of the state’s counties. Sizemore would run again for Governor in the 2022 election, but would lose in the Republican primary.

Democratic primary

Results

Republican primary

Results

Results
Official results from the Oregon Secretary of State are as follows:

References

1998
Gubernatorial
Oregon